This is a list of notable FIFA international referees.  Years in brackets indicate when the referee was added to the FIFA International Referees List. 

Current referees are at the top of the section for each country, while entries of former referees are collapsed.

Algeria

Referees 
 Mehdi Abid Charef (2011)
 Mustapha Ghorbal (2014)

Video Match Officials 
 Mustapha Ghorbal (2021)

Argentina

Men's

Referees 
 Pablo Gaston Echavarria (2022)
 Fernando Gabriel Echenique (2018)
 Fernando David Espinoza (2016)
 Yael Cristian Falcon Perez (2022)
 Dario Humberto Herrera (2015)
 Nicolas Lamolina (2020)
 Patricio Loustau (2011)
 Andres Luis Merlos (2020)
 Fernando Rapallini (2014)
 Facundo Tello (2019)

Video Match Officials 
 Jorge Ignacio Balino (2022)
 German Delfino (2021)
 Patricio Loustau (2021)
 Silvio Trucco (2022)
 Mauro Vigliano (2021)

Women's

Referees 
 Adriana Antonella Alvarez De Olivera (2022)
 Gabriela Elizabeth Coronel (2021)
 Salome Di Iorio (2004)
 Roberta Echeverria (2020)
 Laura Fortunato (2010)

Video Match Officials 
 Salome Di Iorio (2022)

Armenia

Men's

Assistant Referees 
 Sargis Hovhannisyan (2021)

Women's

Assistant Referees 
 Liana Grigoryan (2010)

Australia

Men's

Referees 
 Kurt Ams (2019)
 Jonathan Barreiro (2019)
 Chris Beath (2011)
 Daniel Elder (2022)
 Shaun Evans (2017)
 Alireza Faghani (2008–present)
 Adam Kersey (2022)
 Alexander King (2020)

Video Match Officials 
 Chris Beath (2021)
 Shaun Evans (2021)

Women's

Referees 
 Rebecca Durcau (2017)
 Kate Jacewicz (2011)
 Lara Lee (2019)
 Casey Reibelt (2014)

Assistant Referees 
 Sarah Ho (2004)

Video Match Officials 
 Sarah Ho (2021)
 Kate Jacewicz (2021)
 Casey Reibelt (2021)

Austria

Referees 
 Walter Altmann (2020)
 Christian-Petru Ciochirca (2020)
 Sebastian Gishamer (2019)
 Cristopher Jaeger (2018)
 Harald Lechner (2010)
 Manuel Schuettengruber (2014)
 Julian Weinberger (2018)

Azerbaijan

Men's

Referees 
 Aliyar Aghayev (2013)
 Rauf Jabarov (2019)
 Elchin Masiyev (2021)

Women's

Assistant Referees 
 Sevda Nuriyeva (2021)

Bahrain 
 Ibrahim Youssef Al-Doy
 Mandi Jassim
 Nawaf Shukralla (2007–)

Bangladesh

Former

Belarus
 Alexey Kulbakov (2006–)
 Denis Scherbakov (2012–)
 Sergey Tsinkevich (2010–)

Former

Belgium
 Alexandre Boucaut (2012–present)
 Sébastien Delferiere (2010–)
 Jérôme Efong Nzolo (2008–)
 Serge Gumienny (2003–)
 Jonathan Lardot (2012–present)

Former

Benin
 Coffi Codjia (1994–)

Bolivia
 Raúl Orosco (2009–present)
 Gery Vargas (2012–present)

Former

Bosnia and Herzegovina
Irfan Peljto (2015–present)
Ognjen Valjić (2011–)

Brazil

Anderson Daronco (2015–)

Former

Bulgaria
Georgi Kabakov (2013–present)
Tsvetan Krastev (2014–present)
Stanislav Todorov (2006–)

Former

Cameroon
Néant (Sidi) Alioum (2008–)

Canada

Marie-Soleil Beaudoin (2014)
Drew Fischer (2015)

Central African Republic
Eudoxie Séverine Dertin (2012–)
Prince Arcy Dongombe(2009–)
Jean Marc Ganamandji (2014–)
Jean Marie Koyakobo (2013–)
Sosthene Ngbokaye (2008–)
Etienne Gabato (2015–)
André Kolissala (2015–)

Chad
Idriss Biani (2008–)
Adam Cordier (2005–)
Lamngar Lare (2010–)
Alhadi Mahamat (2012–)
Oumar Mahamat Tahir (2006–)
Issa Abdelhadi (2015–)
Pousri Armi Alfred (2017–)
Ahmat Amara Hassane (2017–)
 Baba Adam Mahamat (2022)

Chile

China PR

Chinese Taipei
Chen Hsin-chuan (2015–)
Kao Jung-fang (2009–)
Yu Ming-hsun (2002–)

Colombia

Comoros
Ali Adelaïd (2009–)
Soulaimane Ansudane (2010–)
Noiret Jim Bacari (2012–)

Congo
Jean Michel Moukoko (2003–)
Chancelle Cynthia Imane Ngakosso (2013–)
Messie Nkounkou (2012–)
Serge Soumou (2010–)
Lazard Tsiba (2009–)
Fitial Charel Just Kokolo (2015–)

Congo DR

Cook Islands
John Pareanga (2005–)
Tupou Patia (2011–)

Costa Rica

Côte d'Ivoire

Croatia

Cuba

Curaçao
Norberto Da Silva Costa (2023–)

Cyprus
Yannis Anastasiou (2010–2021)
Vasilis Dimitriou (2012–)
Sofia Karagiorgi (2007–)
Christos Nicolaides (2009–2017)
Marios Panayi (2010–)
Leontios Trattou (2006–2019)
Vasilis Demetriou
Nikolas Neokleous
Loukas Soteriou
Chrysovalantis Theouli
Andreas Ilia Argyrou

Czech Republic

Denmark

Djibouti
Djamal Aden (2012–)
Farah Aden (2012–)
Souleiman Ahmed Djama (2015–)
Bilal Abdallah Ismael (2017–)
Mohamed Diraneh Guedi (2018–)

Dominica
Rhomie Blanc (2015–)
Charvis Delsol (2017–)

Dominican Republic
Juan Carlos Hidalgo Baez (2012–)
Sandy Vásquez (2012–)
Ramona Zegala Noasil (2013–)
Randy Encarnación (2019–)

Ecuador

Egypt

Ahmed Abou Elela (2005-2015)

El Salvador
Joel Aguilar (2001–present)
Elmer Bonilla (2006–present)
Mirian Patricia Leon Serpas (2013–)
Marlon Mejía (2006–present)
Cibeles Liduvina Miranda Valencia (2014–)
Vilma Hayde Montes Lico (2014–)
Jaime Herrera (2016–)
Ismael Cornejo (2016–)
Germán Martínez (2017–)
Iván Barton (2018–)

England

Years refer to seasons on the National List of Referees. These officials operate at Football League level or above. Seasons spent as a Premier League referee or FIFA referee are indicated in addition where they apply.

Jarred Gillett 2019- FIFA List (ENG) 2023- (AUS) 2013-2019

Equatorial Guinea

Eritrea
Berhane Dangew (2004–)
Amanuel Eyob (2004–)
Luelseghed Ghebremichael (2004–)
Idris Mehammed Osman (2015–)
Yonas Zekarias Ghebre (2016–)
Tsegay Mogos Teklu (2018–)
Yemane Asfaha Gebremedhin (2013–)

Estonia

Ethiopia
kinde Tesema (2000 - 2005)

Faroe Islands
Petur Reinert (2007–)

Fiji
Andrew Anand Achari(2005–)
Ravitesh Behari (2013–)
Salesh Chand (2008–)
Rakesh Varman (2000–)
Finau Vulivuli (2008–)

Finland

France

Gabon

Gambia

Georgia
Tornike Gvantseladze (2013–)
Levan Paniashvili (2000–)
Lashuna Silagava (2005–)
George Vadachkoria (2007–)

Germany

Ghana

Greece

Grenada
Valman Bedeau  (1997–?)
George Phillip (1999–?)
Reon Radix (2018–present)

Guatemala

Guinea

Guinea-Bissau
Gilberto dos Santos (2012–)
Ross Leopoldina Dayves (2004–)
Fidel Gomes (2005–)
João Soares da Gama (2005–)

Guyana

Haiti

Honduras

Hong Kong

Hungary

Iceland

India

Indonesia

Iran

Iraq

Ahmed Sabah Qasim Albaghdadi (2019—)

Ireland
 Anthony Buttimer
 Damien Hancock
 Alan Kelly (2002–present)
 Damien MacGraith
 David McKeon (2004–)
 Paul McLaughlin (2013–present)
 Rob Harvey (2010-)
 Rob Rogers (2012–present)
 Ian Stokes (2004–2011)
 Stuart Templeman (2009-2011)
 Paula Brady (2015–present)
 Darren O’Hagan (2003–present)

Israel

Italy

Jamaica

Japan

Jordan

Kazakhstan
Pavel Saliy (2003–)
Artyom Kuchin(2009-)

Kenya

Korea DPR
Hwang Thae Ho (2004–)
Kang In Chol (2006–)
O Thae Song (2003–)
Choe Kwang-hyon (2015–)

Korea Republic

Kosovo
Genc Nuza (2017–present)
Besfort Kasumi (2018–present)
Visar Kastrati (2020–present)

Kuwait

Kyrgyzstan

Current referees

Men's

Referees 

 Daiyrbek Abdyldayev (2019-)
 Zainiddin Alimov (2021-)
 Nurzatbek Askat Uulu (2021-)
 Denis Shalayev (2020-)
 Mederbek Taichiyev (2021-)

Assistant referees 

 Zamir Chynybekov (2010-)
 Khusan Dhzaladnikov (2018-)
 Sergey Grishchenko (2009-)
 Kanat Myrsabekov (2020-)
 Eldiyar Salybayev (2015-)
 Artyom Skopintsev (2009-)
 Ismailzhan Talipzhanov (2014-)

Video match officials

Futsal referees 

 Nurdin Bukuyev (2006-)
 Eldiyar Keldibekov (2018-)
 Chyngyz Mustafayev (2016-)

Beach soccer referees

Women's

Referees 

 Veronika Bernatskaya (2018-)

Assistant referees 

 Ramina Tsoi (2018-)

Video match officials

Futsal referees

Beach soccer referees

Former 

Emil Busurmankulov (2003–2007)
 Timur Faizullin (2009–2020)
 Dmitry Mashentsev (2004–2020)
 Kiemiddin Piriev (2016-2020)
 Muzaffar Abdullaev (2005–2009)
Rysbek Shekerbekov (2011–2018)

Laos

Current referees

Men's

Referees 

 Xaypaseth Phongsanit (2007-)
 Souei Vongkham (2015-)
 Khamsing Xaiyavongsy (2015-)

Assistant referees 

 Boun Oum Ladsavong (2019-)
 Kilar Ladsavong (2015-)
 Somphavanh Louang (2008-)
 Bounphan Sissouvanh (2018-)
 Phonesooksin Teso (2012-)

Video match officials

Futsal referees 

 Khampasong Xayavongsy (2014-)

Beach soccer referees

Women's

Referees 

 Khamsing Xaiyanvongsy (2021-)

Assistant referees 

 Phutsavan Chanthavong (2019-)

Video match officials

Futsal referees

Beach soccer referees

Former 

Sipaseuth Sinbandith (2005–2011)
Visith Sengamphanh (2013–)

Latvia

Lebanon

Lesotho

Liberia
Isaac Montgomery (2013–)
Jerry Yekeh (2009–)
George Rogers (2016–)

Libya
Abdalla Mohamed ali (1994-2007)

Liechtenstein
 Roland Beck (1995–2003)

Lithuania
Paulius Malžinskas (2001–2009)
Gediminas Mažeika (2008–)
Audrius Žuta (2005–2008)

Luxembourg
Sven Bindels (2011–present)
Alain Hamer (1993–)
Abby Toussaint (2005–)
Luc Wilmes (2002–)

Macau
Wong Kuan Lon (1998–2012)

North Macedonia

Madagascar
Hubert Andriamiharisoa (2006–)
Floriant Raolimanana (2000–)
Hamada Nampiandraza (2011–)
Andofetra Rakotojaona (2014–)
Abdoul Kanoso (2009–)
Ibrahim Ben Tsimanohitsy (2018–)

Malawi

Malaysia

Maldives
Adam Fazeel (2015-)
Mohamed Javiz (2016–)

Mali

Malta
Marco Borg (2008–)
Chris Lautier (2005–)
Anton Zammit (1995–)
Farrugia Cann T.
Joseph Attard (1999-2010)

Mauritania

Mauritius

Mexico

Moldova
Veaceslav Banari (2003–)
Igor Satchi (2007–)
Ghennadi Sidenco (2006–)

Montenegro
Jovan Kaludjerović (2008–)
Pavle Radovanović (2008–)
Miodrag Raduloviс (2001–2010)

Morocco

Mozambique

Myanmar
U Win Cho (2004–)
U Hla Tint (2004–)
U THANT ZIN OO (1983)

Namibia

Nepal
Dilip Rajak (1999–)
Gyanu Shrestha (1993–)
Surendra Sikhrakar (1997–)

Netherlands
John Blankenstein (1985–1995)
Kevin Blom (2005–)
Ruud Bossen (2001–2007)
Eric Braamhaar (2002–2011)
Charles Corver (1972-1983)
Ben Haverkort (2002-2006)
Leo Horn
Jack van Hulten
Dick Jol (1993–2001)
Jan Keizer (1972-1989)
Björn Kuipers (2006–2021)
Roelof Luinge (1992–2000)
Danny Makkelie (2011–present)
Bas Nijhuis (2007–)
René Temmink (2001–2006)
Pol van Boekel (2008–)
Mario van der Ende (1990–2002)
Dick van Egmond (1997–2007)
Tom van Sichem
Pieter Vink (2004–2010)
Jan Wegereef (1995–2007)
Peter Gans (1975–1983)
Serdar Gozubuyuk (2012 - )

New Caledonia
Médéric Lacour (2016–)
 Bertrand Brial (Assistant referee 2016–)

New Zealand

Nicaragua
José Guerrero (2002–)
Óscar Dávila (2011–)
Nitzar Sandoval (2018–)
Erick Lezama (2019–)

Niger

Nigeria
Emmanuel Imiere (2001–)
Abdullahi Shuaibu (2014–)
Abubakar Ago (2009–)
Joshua Amao (2009–)
Ferdinand Udoh (2013–)
Benjamin Odey (2011–)
Quadri Ololade Adebimpe (2016–)
 Osareniye Aigbe
 Folusho Ajayi
 Jelili Ogunmuyiwa
Joseph Odey Ogabor (2017–)
Salisu Basheer (2016–)
Ibrahim Towobola   (2000)

Northern Ireland

Norway

Oman

Pakistan

 Hakim Nisar ( Referee Peshawar)

Palestine
Mahmoud Al Jaish (2001–)
Anas Eid (2003–)
Ibrahim Gharouf (2006–)
Michael Hanania (2003–)
Baraa Aisha (2016–)
Khaled Ammar (2005–)

Panama

Papua New Guinea

Paraguay

Peru

Philippines
Allan Martinez (2002–)
Celso Soldevilla (2002–)
Clifford Daypuyat (2014–)

Poland

Portugal

Puerto Rico
Jesus Angel Lebron Delgado (2007–)
Javier Santos (2007–present)
William Anderson (2012–present)
José Raúl Torres (2019–present)

Qatar

Romania

Soviet Union and Russia

Rwanda

Saint Kitts and Nevis
James Matthew (2003–)
Kimbell Ward (2013–)
Tristley Bassue (2015–)
Trevester Richards (2018–)

Saint Lucia
Gilles Arthur (1997–)
Francis Fanus (1997–)
John George (2001–)
Leo Clarke (2011–)

Saint Vincent and the Grenadines
Moeth Gaymes (2014–)

San Marino
Stefano Podeschi (2002–)
Gabriele Rossi (2004–)

São Tomé and Príncipe
Hélio Espírito Santo (1999–)
Valdemar Cassandra Costa (2002–)
Ditonil da Costa Lima
Raul Aguiar dos Santos (2013–)
Esterline Gonçalves Género (2016–)

Saudi Arabia

Scotland

Updated 7 January 2023

Senegal

Serbia

Seychelles

Sierra Leone

Singapore

Slovakia
Vladimír Hriňák (1993–2009)
Ľuboš Micheľ (1993–2008)
Pavel Olšiak (2005–)
Anton Stredák (1995–2004)
Lukáš Peško (2010–present)
Ivan Kružliak (2011–present)
Filip Glova (2016–present)
Peter Kráľovič (2013–present)
Michal Očenáš (2017–present)
Rastislav Behančín (2017–present)
Peter Budáč (2020–present)
Martin Matula (2020–present)
Erik Gemzický (2021–present)
Ladislav Angyal (2021–present)

Slovenia
Darko Čeferin (2000–2012)
Matej Jug (2007–)
Robert Kranjc (2002–)
Damir Skomina (2003–)
Slavko Vinčić (2010-)

Solomon Islands

Somalia
Abdi Abdulle Ahmed (1998–)
Moktar Mo'alim Yusuf (2011)
Hassan Mohamed Hagi (2014–)
Hagi Wiish (2011–)
Mohamed Mokhtar Sheikh(1986)
Omar Abdulkadir Artan (2018–)
Mohamed Nur Muhudin (2018–)
Abdi Omar Abdirahman(2010-)
Mahad Ali Mohamoud

South Africa

South Sudan
Gait Metodious Oting (2015–)
Ring Nyier Akech Malong (2015–)
Alier Michael James (2015–)
George Primito Olibo (2105-)

Spain

Sri Lanka
Hettikamkanamge Perera (2004–)
Nivon Robesh Gamini (2010–)

Sudan

Suriname

Men's

Football referees

Jerry Budel (2002–)
Henry Kia (1999–)
Antonius Pinas (1996–)
Enrico Wijngaarde (2002–2014)
Johannes Dolaini (2013–2019)
Sergio Rozenhout(2022-)

Assistent referees
Zachari zeegelaar (2014-
Soren Amalensi 
Widjai Sardjoe(2019-)

women's

Assistent referees
Mijensa Rench
Suelle Shepperd

Futsal referee
Anthony Terborg

Swaziland
Gilbert Dlamini (2002–)
Mbongseni Fakudze (2002–)
Simanga Nhleko (2002–)
Thulani Sibandze (2012–)

Sweden

Switzerland

Syria

Tahiti
Norbert Hauata (2008–)
Averii Jacques (2007–)
Abdelkader Zitouni (2012–)

Tajikistan
Khurshed Dadoboev (2006–)
Ravshan Ishmatov (2006–)
Rustam Kholov (2006–)
Dilovar Orzuev (2005–)
Nasrullo Kabirov (2013–)
Sadullo Gulmurodi (2017–)

Tanzania

Thailand

Togo

Tonga
Ichikawa Polovili (2009–)

Trinidad and Tobago

Tunisia

Turkey

Turkmenistan

Turks and Caicos Islands
Gianni Ascani (2015–2017)
Dane Ritchie (2016–2018)

Uganda

Ukraine

United Arab Emirates

United States

2022 US FIFA Referees

Danielle Chesky (2020-)
Ismail Elfath (2016-)
Ekaterina Koroleva (2014-)
Jair Marrufo (2007–)
Tori Penso (2021-)
Nima Saghafi (2020-)
Natalie Simon (2022-)
Rubiel Vasquez (2020-)
Armando Villarreal (2015–)

2022 USA FIFA Assistant Referees

Frank Anderson (2012-)
Ian Anderson (2017-)
Kyle Atkins (2018-)
Cameron Richardson (2019-)
Logan Brown (2020-)
Jennifer Garner (2018-)
Jeremy Kieso (2022-)
Felisha Mariscal (2014-)
Brooke Mayo (2018-)
Alicia Messer (2018-)
Meghan Mullen (2022-)
Kathryn Nesbitt (2016-)
Corey Parker (2015-)
Cory Richardson (2022-)
Corey Rockwell (2007-)
Luis "Nick" Uranga (2020-)

2022 USA FIFA Video Match Officials (VAR)

Kyle Atkins (2022-)
Allen Chapman (2021-)
Ismail Elfath (2022-)
Tim Ford (2021-)
Edvin Jurisevic (2021-)
Felisha Mariscal (2022-)
Jair Marrufo (2022-)
Kathryn Nesbitt (2022-)
Chris Penso (2021-)
Armando Villareal (2022-)

2022 US FIFA Futsal Referees

Josh Wilkens (2019-)

Former US FIFA Officials (List is incomplete)

Arturo Angeles (–)
Esfandiar Baharmast
Edward Bellion (1980–1989)
Angelo Bratsis (1980–1991)
David Coombs  1980-1992
Robert Evans (1979–1987)
Mark Geiger (2008–2019)
David Gould (1926-unknown)
Brian Hall (1992–2006)
Edvin Jurisevic (2010–2017
Michael Kennedy (1999–2006)
Toros Kibritjian (1968–1982)
Vincent Mauro (1986–1991)
Joshua Patlak (1994–1998)
Arkadiusz Prus (2004–unknown)
Chris Penso (2013-2015, as Referee) Current VMO (See above)
Ricardo Salazar (2005–2015)
Kari Seitz (1999–2013)
David Socha (1978–1986)
Kevin Stott (1995–2008)
Paul Tamberino (−2001)
Jennifer Bennett (2003–2011)
Gegham Vardanyan (2004–2008)
Kevin Terry (1998–2004)
Baldomero Toledo (2007–2017)
Ted Unkel (2016-2021)
Ricardo Valenzuela (unknown−2005)
Terry Vaughn (2004–2011)
George Lambie (1882–1965)
Zimmerman "Zim" Boulos

United States Virgin Islands
Hillaren Frederick (2000–)

Uruguay

Uzbekistan

Vanuatu
Lencie Fred (2000–2009)
Robinson Banga (2010–)
Joel Hopkken (2007–)

Venezuela

Vietnam

Wales

Years for referees appointed before 1992 refer to their years on the English Football League List; years spent on the Welsh FIFA List and English Premier League List are added where applicable.

Yemen
Foud Al Gunaid (2001–)
Khalaf Al Labany (2001–)
Mukhtar Al Yarimi (2001–)

Zambia

Wellington Kaoma (2000–)
Wilson Mpanisi (2002–)
Cornelius Mwansa (2000–)
Wisdom Chewe (2013–)
Janny Sikazwe (2007–)
Stanley Hachiwa (2013–)
Audrick Nkole (2018–)

Zimbabwe

Notes

References

External links

 Official FIFA list of international referees
 Official FIFA list of international referees (archived)
 World Referee archive

Association football referees
Assoc
Referees
Referees